List of massacres in Israel is a list of massacres that have occurred in Israel after the 1948 Palestine War.

For massacres that have occurred in Roman Judea prior to the establishment of the Roman province of Syria Palæstina, see List of massacres in Roman Judea.
For massacres that took place prior to the British Mandate, see List of massacres in Ottoman Syria.
For massacres that took place in Mandatory Palestine, see List of killings and massacres in Mandatory Palestine. 
For massacres that took place during the 1948 Palestine War, see Killings and massacres during the 1948 Palestine War. 
For massacres that have occurred in the West Bank and Gaza since 1948, see List of massacres in the Palestinian territories:

See also

List of killings and massacres in Mandatory Palestine
List of attacks against Israeli civilians before 1967
List of massacres in Jerusalem
Civilian casualties in the Second Intifada
List of Palestinian suicide attacks
Palestinian political violence

References

Israel
Massacres

Israeli–Palestinian conflict-related lists
Massacres